The 1968 National Challenge Cup was the 55th edition of the United States Soccer Football Association's annual open soccer championship. No North American Soccer League teams played in the tournament because it was during the offseason and it was when National Professional Soccer League and United Soccer Association were merging at the time. In the end, New York Greek American Atlas F.C. won its second of three straight National Cups.

Bracket

Final

First game

Second game

External links
 1968 U.S. Open Cup – TheCup.us

U.S. Open Cup
Us Open
National Challenge Cup